The Catoctin Creek Distilling Company, which operates under the trade name of Catoctin Creek, is the first legal distillery in Loudoun County, Virginia since prohibition.  The distillery is a certified organic and kosher microdistillery in Purcellville, Virginia that produces brandy, rye whiskey, and gin from local fruit, organic grain and Virginia wine.

The distillery was founded in 2009 by Scott and Rebecca Harris using an SBA 7(a) loan for start-up capital. Initially, the company operated using custom-made 400 and 1200 liter Kothe hybrid pot-column stills. 

In the 2011 session of the Virginia General Assembly, the company sought approval to sell its spirits at the distillery.  Virginia Senate Bill 1249 passed both the Senate and the House of Delegates and was then signed by Governor Bob McDonnell on March 26, 2011, allowing direct bottle-sales to the public from the distillery.  With the prior year's passage of 2010 House of Delegate Bill 952, the company now provides tastings at their distillery store, in a fashion similar to wineries within the state.

In 2012, the distillery purchased the historic Case Building (built 1921) on Main Street in Purcellville, and renovated the building as the home of their new distillery.  Renovations included structural repair to the roof, complete electrical upgrade, new plumbing systems, fire sprinklers, a new tasting room, extensive masonry repair, and a 41kWh solar array.

In 2017, the distillery announced a new minority partner and investor, Constellation Brands of Victor, New York.  In a company press release, Rebecca Harris, the co-founder and chief distiller, stated the reasoning behind the investment:  "In order to expand our production and portfolio, we needed the right partner for the next level of growth. Constellation has a strong commitment to this category..." Scott and Rebecca Harris, the co-founders, remain the majority owners and managers of the business.

In 2021, the company upgraded their production equipment, tripling their capacity, including a new mash cooker, fermenters, and a 2000 liter Specific Engineering hybrid pot-column still, replacing the older 400 liter pot still.

COVID-19 pandemic
During the COVID-19 pandemic and a subsequent shortage on sanitizing products in March 2020, Catoctin Creek shifted most of its production operations to provide free sanitizing alcohol to over 100 families, six police stations, two emergency services, two hospitals, one senior center, and the FAA in Leesburg, Virginia. Instead of laying people off, management brought regional sales staff in to help on the production line, while working with elected officials to distribute bottles to organizations in need.

After producing, bottling and selling bulk hand sanitizer to first responders at the end of March, Catoctin Creek announced the release of their FDA approved 6 oz. hand sanitizer bottles to the general public in early April, which sold out in three weeks. Due to the lack of availability of raw materials to produce the sanitizer, their production of hand sanitizer ended in April 2020. In the end, Catoctin Creek made over 2,050 gallons of sanitizer available to the public, first responders, front-line workers and others in need. The craft distillery also raised and donated over $12,000 to local charities, including hospitality relief funds, clinics and food banks in Baltimore, Washington DC, and Virginia.  The distillery received a commendation from the Virginia Senate for their efforts during the pandemic, noting "through its decisive and selfless actions in the face of a historic public health emergency, Catoctin Creek Distilling Company has exemplified what makes the Commonwealth a wonderful place to live, work, and raise a family."

Catoctin Creek is still producing and selling its award-winning rye whisky, gin and brandy on its online shop for curbside pickup or delivery.

Spirits produced
Rye whiskey
Brandy from grapes, pears, peaches, and apples.
Gin

Awards
Roundstone Rye
Double Gold medal for Cask Proof, San Francisco World Spirits Competition, 2017
Gold medal for Cask Proof, American Whiskey Masters, 2016
Gold medal for Cask Proof, Wizards of Whisky Awards, 2016
Gold medal for 92 Proof, New York World Wine and Spirits Competition, 2015
Gold medal for Cask Proof, Wizards of Whisky Awards, 2015
Silver medal for 92 Proof, San Francisco World Spirits Competition, 2015
Silver medal for 92 Proof, Wizards of Whisky Awards, 2015
Gold medal for rye whiskey, Artisan Awards, 2014
Gold medal for rye whiskey, The Fifty Best, 2014
Bronze medal, San Francisco World Spirits Competition, 2013
Bronze medal, American Distilling Institute, 2013
Gold seal, Good Food Awards, 2013
Gold medal for rye whiskey, The Fifty Best, 2012
Silver medal and best in category for aged rye whiskey, American Distilling Institute, 2011
Silver medal (87 - highly recommended) for rye whiskey, Beverage Testing Institute, 2011
Silver medal for aged craft distillery less than two years (less than $40), New York International Spirits Competition, 2010
Mosby's Spirit
Bronze medal and best in category for un-aged rye whiskey, American Distilling Institute, 2011
Strong recommendation (87 - very good), American Whiskey, Ultimate Spirits Challenge, 2011
Silver medal (85 - highly recommended) for unaged whiskey, Beverage Testing Institute, 2011
Silver medal for unaged craft distillery (less than $40), New York International Spirits Competition, 2010
Bronze medal for unaged whiskey, American Distilling Institute, 2010
Watershed Gin
Gold medal (91 - exceptional) for gin, Beverage Testing Institute, 2011
Silver medal for Gin, New York International Spirits Competition, 2011
Regional Food and Beverage Producer - 2015 RAMMY Awards, Restaurant Association of Metropolitan Washington (RAMW) 
Virginia's Finest - Virginia Department of Agriculture and Consumer Services
2012 Small Business of the Year - Loudoun County Chamber of Commerce
2011 Entrepreneur of the Year and Rural Business of the Year - Loudoun County Chamber of Commerce
Made in the South 2010 Awards - Garden and Gun magazine

Distribution
Catoctin Creek is distributed in the United States in the following states:

 Arizona
 California
 Connecticut
 Delaware
 District of Columbia
 Florida
 Georgia
 Idaho
 Illinois

 Kentucky
 Maryland
 Massachusetts
 Michigan
 Minnesota
 Missouri
 Nevada
 New Jersey
 New Mexico

 New York
 Pennsylvania
 South Carolina
 Tennessee
 Texas
 Virginia
 Washington
 Wyoming

Catoctin Creek is distributed internationally in:
 Europe
 Mexico
 Singapore

References

2009 establishments in Virginia
American companies established in 2009
Distilleries in Virginia
Food and drink companies established in 2009
Gins
Purcellville, Virginia
Rye whiskey